Four ships operated by the Sheaf Steam Shipping Co were named Sheaf Mount.

, in service 1919–30
, in service 1939–42
, in service 1945–57, 
, in service 1965–72, 

Ship names